Abd al-Baqi al-Zurqani (1611–1688) was an Islamic scholar from Egypt, connected to Al-Azhar. His full name was Abd al-Baqiy ibn Yusuf ibn Ahmad ibn Muhammad ibn Ulwan al-Zurqani.
He is the father of Muhammad al-Zurqani and the commentator of al-Jundi's Mukhtasar Khalil, itself annotated by Muhammad ibn al-Hassan al-Bannani (1113-1194/1701-1780), titled al-Fath al-Rabbani.

Works
Commentary on Al-Jundi's Mukhtasar

See also
List of Islamic scholars

References

External links
http://www.idcpublishers.com/ead/dsc.php?c01=c0105&faid=438faid.xml

1611 births
1688 deaths
Islamic scholars
Egyptian Maliki scholars